The Outsider is a British television drama series produced by Yorkshire Television and screened on the ITV network in late 1983.

Plot

Successful journalist Frank Scully (John Duttine) is visiting old friends, the Harpers (Joanna Dunham and Norman Eshley), in the Yorkshire country town of Micklethorpe. Deciding to stay on, he takes the job of editor of the local newspaper, the Messenger. Fiona Neave (Carol Royle), who runs the local print works, becomes Scully's love interest, as he soon becomes embroiled in local affairs.

Background

The Outsider was the brainchild of writer Michael J. Bird, who researched the series by visiting Jim McTaggart, the editor of the Teesdale Mercury newspaper in County Durham. The series was commissioned by David Cunliffe, who had previously worked with Bird on the BBC drama series The Lotus Eaters, at Yorkshire Television for a run of six episodes. The Leeds YTV studio was used for interior scenes, whilst on location, the North Yorkshire town of Knaresborough doubled for the fictional Micklethorpe.

A paperback novelisation by Hugh Miller was published by Granada to tie in with the transmission of the series.

Plans for a second series of The Outsider were abandoned due to the lead actor John Duttine being unavailable, having signed with the BBC to star in the sitcom Lame Ducks.

Cast

John Duttine as Frank Scully
Carol Royle as Fiona Neave
Joanna Dunham as Sylvia Harper
Norman Eshley as Donald Harper
Peter Clay as Lord Wrathdale
Elizabeth Bennett as Lady Wrathdale
Pauline Letts as Miss. Banner
Michael Sheard as Reuben Flaxman
Ted Morris as Ted Holliday

Episodes

References

External links
 

Outsider, The
Outsider, The
Outsider, The
Outsider, The
Outsider, The
Television shows set in Yorkshire
English-language television shows